Henry Frayne may refer to:

 Henry Frayne (musician) (born 1965), Irish-American musician
 Henry Frayne (athlete) (born 1990), Australian track and field athlete